PSYMA GROUP AG is a holding company for a network of market research companies. Currently, the PSYMA GROUP is the fifth largest market research company and the largest owner-run company in Germany. Headquarters is located in Nuremberg, Germany.

Legal Status 
The PSYMA GROUP AG holding company is an unlisted stock company, where the stocks are held by the founders and the managing directors. Its affiliates cover various business areas, in the sectors: Medical technology & pharmaceuticals research, consumer goods research, media research, automotive research, financial services research, IT & telecommunication research, industrial & capital goods research.

History 
The company was founded in 1957 as the „arbeitsgruppe für psychologische marktanalysen“ by Dr. Reinhold Bergler, Dr. Manfred Hambitzer and Dr. Klaus Haupt, originally as an academic company and not a commercial company. The methodologies deployed included  in-depth psychological, qualitative interviews. In 1967, the company opened one of the first professional pharmaceutical market research departments. This was followed by a continued international expansion. In 2001, Psyma Group AG was founded as a holding company for the operative subsidiaries and joint ventures. As of August 2010, the company has offices in 13 countries and conducts market research in over 40 countries.

References

External links 
 Psyma Group homepage
 Psyma Latina - Latin American subsidiary homepage

Public opinion research companies
Companies based in Nuremberg
Research and analysis firms
Market research companies of Germany